Dr. William Claudius Irby House, also known as the Crowe House, is a historic home located at Laurens, Laurens County, South Carolina.

Background
The Dr. William Claudius Irby House was built about 1890, and is a two-story, frame residence sheathed in weatherboarding with a cross-gable roof with Eastlake style elements. It features include a two-tiered porch on the façade and a single-story porches on the side elevations.  Also on the property is a fieldstone outbuilding.

It was added to the National Register of Historic Places in 1986.

References

Houses on the National Register of Historic Places in South Carolina
Houses completed in 1890
Houses in Laurens County, South Carolina
National Register of Historic Places in Laurens County, South Carolina